KSGF may refer to:

 KSGF (AM), a radio station (1260 AM) licensed to Springfield, Missouri, United States
 KSGF-FM, a radio station (104.1 FM) licensed to Ash Grove, Missouri, United States
 The ICAO code for Springfield-Branson National Airport, a public airport in Springfield, Missouri, United States